Power Without Responsibility (subtitled: The Press and Broadcasting in Britain or Press, Broadcasting and the Internet in Britain) is a book written by James Curran (Professor of Communications at Goldsmiths College) and Jean Seaton (Professor of Media History at the University of Westminster). Originally published in 1981 by Fontana, it has been translated into several languages and is now in its seventh edition. The title comes from a quote by former British Prime Minister Stanley Baldwin. It details the history of the news media in the UK from the eighteenth century to the present. It has been cited by Noam Chomsky in the introduction to Manufacturing Consent and by him in a televised BBC interview with Andrew Marr. Nick Cohen rated it "the best guide to the British media" in a review for the New Statesman.

Contents (Seventh edition)
Part I - Press history
 Whig press history as political mythology
 The struggle for a free press
 The ugly face of reform
 The industrialization of the press
 The era of the press barons
 The press under public regulation
 Fable of market democracy

Part II - Broadcasting history
 Reith and the denial of politics
 Broadcasting and the Blitz
 Social revolution?
 The BBC under threat
 Class, taste & profit
 How the audience is made
 The first new media
 Broadcasting roller-coaster

Part III - Rise of new media
 New media in Britain
 History of the internet
 Sociology of the internet

Part IV - Theories of the media
 Metabolising Britishness
 Global understanding
 The liberal theory of press freedom
 Broadcasting and the theory of public service

Part V - Politics of the media
 Contradictions in media policy
 Media reform: democratic choices

Books about the media